Chris Jesty (born 1942) is a British author and cartographer who revised Alfred Wainwright's Pictorial Guide to the Lakeland Fells to produce the second edition (2005–2009) of the books, which were originally published in 1955–1966. He used GPS to survey all the routes and the work involved 3,000 hand-drawn changes in the first volume alone, reflecting changes such as walls having fallen down or a quarry being opened on the line of a footpath, and adding information such as car parking.

Jesty had earlier lived in Dolgellau, north Wales, and in the 1970s produced and published a panorama of the view from Snowdon, available as a single sheet or in four sections. In 1978 he published a panorama of the view from Scafell Pike with illustrations by Wainwright. He then moved to Bridport in Dorset, where he wrote several books about that area before moving to Kendal in Cumbria.

In 1979, he wrote to Wainwright offering to update the guides, but Wainwright replied that he did not want this done in his lifetime. In 1989, Wainwright agree that Jesty could update the guides, but after his death in 1991, when Jesty had worked on the project for 18 months, the guides were sold to Michael Joseph publishers who were not interested in the updates. Some time later the guides were transferred to Frances Lincoln Publishers and the decision was made to produce new editions, not only of the Pictorial Guide but also of several of Wainwright's other walking guides. The last two of these were published in April 2014. The publishers have announced that Clive Hutchby is working on the third edition of the Pictorial Guide, with the first volume, The Eastern Fells published in March 2015, followed by  The Far Eastern Fells in October 2015.

Publications

Revised editions of Alfred Wainwright's works
All published by Frances Lincoln Publishers.
Pennine Way Companion, revised edition, 2004 
 Pictorial Guide to the Lakeland Fells, 7 vols, 2nd edition, 2005–2009  (boxed set – also available individually)
Wainwright: The Podcasts Eight Lakeland Walks with Wainwright, 2008 
A Coast to Coast Walk, 2nd edition, 2010 
Wainwright's TV Walks, 2nd edition, 2010 
The Best of Wainwright, edited by Hunter Davies, 2nd edition, 
 The Outlying Fells of Lakeland, 2nd edition, 2011 
Pennine Way Companion, 2nd edition, September 2012 
Walks in Limestone Country: The Whernside, Ingleborough and Penyghent areas of Yorkshire, 2nd edition, April 2014 
Walks on the Howgill Fells: and Adjoining Fells , 2nd edition, April 2014

Other works include
A Guide to the Isle of Purbeck, Wimborne: Dovecote, 1984 
Dorset Town Trails, Wimborne: Roy Gasson, 1985 
A Guide to the West Dorset Countryside, Wimborne: Dovecote, 1986 
East Anglian Town Trails, London: Hale, 1989 
Exploring Dorset by Car, Wimborne: Dovecote, 1990 
"Happy Memories" (autobiography), 2018

References

External links

"Castle Crag" Article by Chris Jesty published on Alfred Wainwright Books & Memorabilia

1940s births
Living people
British non-fiction outdoors writers
British travel writers
British illustrators
British cartographers